Bordan Tkachuk is a British business executive, the former CEO of Viglen, also known from his appearances on the BBC-produced British version of The Apprentice, interviewing for his boss Lord Sugar.

Career
Born in the UK on 28 August 1954, he took an HND in computer science, working for various companies providing computer programming, latterly including an oil service company. His family was Ukrainian.

In the late 1970s after travelling, he moved to Australia and started a computer dealership. Bought out by Commodore International, he worked for CBM as a sales manager.

Head hunted by Amstrad, he joined their operation in Australia, before returning to the UK to try to address issues surrounding production of the IBM-like PC. After Amstrad withdrew from the PC market place, Tkachuk became CEO of Viglen.

The Apprentice
He came to UK public recognition through his direct style of job interviewing on The Apprentice, having appeared in the first six series. Notable events during these interviews include discovering that the eventual Series 4 winner Lee McQueen had lied on his CV about his time spent at university and that Series 6 contestant Stuart Baggs had exaggerated his telecommunication operations. In the latter interview, he incorrectly told Baggs that "ISP" stood for "Internet Service Protocol" (instead of Internet Service Provider).

"I know what ISP is. It's an Internet Service Protocol. And that's what you're providing. It's not a telecoms operating licence. It's a protocol that allows telecoms over bandwidths.

"I've been running Alan Sugar's companies for the last 25 years, and that's why I know a little bit about technology."

References

External links
My Way:Bordan Tkachuk

Living people
1954 births
British businesspeople
British expatriates in Australia
The Apprentice (British TV series)